Azerbaijan Railways is the national state-owned rail transport operator in the Republic of Azerbaijan. The ,  gauge network is electrified at 3 kV (3,000 V) DC. The headquarters of the Azerbaijan Railways is in the capital Baku.

Azerbaijan Railways is a successor of Soviet Railways, which itself was the successor of Russian Imperial Railways.

Following the collapse of the Soviet Union in 1991 its railway system broke up into national railway systems of various former Soviet republics from which the independent Republic of Azerbaijan and the Azerbaijan Railways both emerged in that year.

The first railway line in Azerbaijan was laid in 1878 and was opened in 1880 in the suburbs outside Baku.

The railway has 176 stations, 2 of which Biləcəri (in Baku) and Şirvan are completely automated, 12 stations have container courts with adapted mechanisms and machines, 3 stations – Keşlə (in Baku), Gəncə and Xırdalan are able to supply high cargo containers.

The national network has no high-speed lines and is not served by high-speed trains.

Along with the Kars–Tbilisi–Baku railway, a regional rail link project that directly connects Turkey, Georgia and Azerbaijan since 2017, the railway lines are being modernised in Azerbaijan with new fast rail stock to replace the old rail stock which are still in service.

The total length of the Azerbaijan Railways ranks 57 in country comparison to the world.

History

Russian Imperial Railways 1878-1917 

The first railway line in Azerbaijan then belonging to the Russian Empire was laid in 1878 and was opened in 1880 within the suburban range of Baku, which led from Sabunçu to Suraxanı, today situated within the city of Baku. The track width corresponded to the Russian  gauge.

The first long-distance railway line was opened in 1883, which led from Baku to Tbilisi in Georgia.

In 1900 railway lines were opened which connected Baku via Biləcəri with Derbent and Petrovsk (Makhachkala) in Dagestan and thus connected Azerbaijan with the rest of the Russian Empire (and later the Soviet Union).

In 1908 with extension of the railway line from Ararat in Armenia to Şərur and Julfa in the Nakhchivan exclave of Azerbaijan, this part of Azerbaijan was connected with Armenia.

Thus the development of the Azerbaijani Railway was for the time being considered final.

Soviet Railways 1917-1991 

After the collapse of the Russian Empire and the Russian Revolution the country was transformed into the Soviet Union and the Russian Imperial Railways into the Soviet Railways.

Due to the availability of electricity from the vast water power sources of Azerbaijan, the very early electrification of the railway lines of Azerbaijan began.  
In 1926 with the electrification with 1,2 kV (1,200 V) direct current of the railway line between Baku and Sabunçu, it became the first electrically operated railway line of the Soviet Union. Later electrifications took place with 3 kV (3,000 V) direct current.

In 1924 the railway line was extended southwards to Ələt and Neftçala.

In 1941 the railway line was extended from Horadiz and Mincivan through Armenia including a railway line extension to Kapan, to Julfa in the Nakhchivan exclave of Azerbaijan. Thus the Nakhchivan exclave of Azerbaijan was finally connected with Azerbaijan proper.

In 1941 the railway line was also extended southwards to Astara, Azerbaijan at the southern border with Iran.

In 1944 the railway line was extended to Kətəlparaq, Ağdam and Stepanakert (Xankəndi).

Until 1991 the railway traffic was operated in Azerbaijan by the Soviet Railway under supervision of the Soviet Traffic Ministry. The Azerbaijani branch of the Soviet Railways was divided into three departments of Baku, Gəncə and Nakhchivan City.

Azerbaijan Railways (Azərbaycan Dəmir Yolları) 1991–present 

With the independence of the Republic of Azerbaijan in 1991, the Azerbaijan State Railways (Azərbaycan Dövlət Dəmir Yolları) was formed the same year.

Due to the conflict with Armenia over the Nagorno-Karabakh region in Azerbaijan, the railway service in the Armenian occupied areas of Azerbaijan including Nagorno-Karabakh as well as international railway traffic to Armenia has been cut. As a result, 240.4 km of Azerbaijani railway was under Armenian occupation. Thus also no railway traffic exists to the Azerbaijani exclave Nakhchivan which is divided from the rest of Azerbaijan by Armenia, but is not under Armenian occupation. The railway traffic into Iran which is only via Nakhchivan is likewise cut. Due to this, international railway traffic between Azerbaijan and Iran is continuing only with Nakhchivan. International railway traffic also exists with the Russian Railways and the Georgian Railway and is scheduled with the Turkish State Railways via Georgia from 2017 onwards.

In freight traffic, the exportation of oil from the oil wells from Baku at the Caspian Sea to the Georgian port of Batumi at the Black Sea forms an important share of the rail transport in Azerbaijan:
The freight market share of the Azerbaijan State Railway was 21% in 1999.

In 2009 the closed joint-stock company "Azerbaijan Railways" (Azәrbaycan Dәmir Yolları Qapalı Səhmdar Cəmiyyəti, "ADY" QSC) - the national operator of the railway network in Azerbaijan with 100% state capital – was founded on the basis of the Azerbaijan State Railways, functionally replacing it.

The Kars–Tbilisi–Baku railway is a regional railway project to directly connect Turkey, Georgia and Azerbaijan. The project was scheduled for completion in 2017. Although no additional railway lines will be added in Azerbaijan itself, as this section in Azerbaijan is already double track and electrified, the railway lines will be modernised and new and fast rail stock will be added and will replace the old rail stock which are still in service. The freight market share of the railways are also expected to rise rapidly with completion of the Kars–Tbilisi–Baku railway.

Stadler is to supply double-deck EMUs to Azerbaijan. An agreement for the supply of five Kiss double-deck electric multiple-units was signed by Stadler Rail CEO Peter Spuhler and Javid Gurbanov, Chairman of national railway ADY, at the TransCaspian 2015 trade fair in Baku on May 13.

National railway ADDY has placed a €300 million order for 50 Alstom KZ8A twin-section 25 kV AC electric freight locomotives. Also September 7, 2015, Alstom has begun developing the components for AZ8A freight electric locomotives, intended for supply to Azerbaijan.

ADY has two districts: metropolitan Azerbaijani district, centered on Baku yard, Nakhchivan district, centered on Nakhchivan central station. All passenger operation in metropolitan Azerbaijan is centered in Baku.

Baku suburban railway

In 2019 a commuter railway in Baku was launched, connecting it to Sabunçu.

International railway links with neighboring countries 
  Russia - open -  gauge.
  Georgia - open -  gauge.
  Iran - open - break-of-gauge  -  - only via the Azerbaijani exclave Nakhchivan (Julfa/Jolfa railway bridge), a railway link with Azerbaijan proper is being built. See North–South Transport Corridor.
  Turkey - open - link to Turkey with break-of-gauge  -  from Georgia is opened on 30 October 2017. See Kars–Tbilisi–Baku railway.
  Armenia - closed -  gauge - closed because of the ongoing Nagorno-Karabakh conflict between Armenia and Azerbaijan.

Timeline

2007 
 On February 7, 2007 an agreement was signed for the construction Kars-Tbilisi-Baku railway.
 On September 12, 2007, Musa Panahov, the Deputy Minister of Transport of Azerbaijan, announces that construction on the Baku-Tbilisi-Kars railway will begin in October.  Construction is budgeted at $200 million, of which $50 million has been allocated from the State Oil Fund of Azerbaijan (SOFAZ).
 On November 21, 2007, the presidents of Azerbaijan - Ilham Aliyev, Georgia - Mikheil Saakashvili, and Turkey - Abdullah Gül inaugurated the construction of the railway at a groundbreaking ceremony at the  Marabda junction south of Tbilisi, and the first rails were planned to be laid in April 2008.

2008 
The Russian-Georgian-Ossetian conflict (2008 South Ossetia war) and environmental problems delayed the project, which was originally to be completed by 2010 but is now scheduled for completion by 2017.

2009 
On 14, 2009, Azerbaijan Railways, Islamic Republic of Iran Railways and Russian Railways agreed on implementing the project to build a new line between Qazvin, Resht, and Astara, Iran with Astara, Azerbaijan which would link with the rail network of Azerbaijan and also Russia. A standard gauge connection to the Iranian railway network along the shore of the Caspian Sea is planned.  This break of gauge station has been equipped with bogie exchange and SUW 2000 variable gauge axle track gauge changing facility. The line also will link Nakhchivan to Azerbaijan proper via Iran.

Azerbaijan Railways have long distance trains to Tyumen (Tuesday, Thursday and Saturday in week), Rostov (every two days in the summer, every four days in the winter), Moscow (Tuesday and Friday) and Kyiv (Via Russia, Wednesday).

2016 
A new service from Nakhchivan to Mashad was launched in December.

2017 
A new line to Turkey was opened in October for freight, with passenger service hoped to start in 2020 after a long delay. See Kars–Tbilisi–Baku railway. More than 500 kilometres of the 850-kilometre-long railway pass through Azerbaijan. The operation of the Baku-Tbilisi-Kars line, the shortest and most reliable road connecting Europe with Asia, has increased Azerbaijan's logistics capacity in the East-West transport corridor.

2018 
Azerbaijan launches first long-distance high-speed train from Baku to Ganja City in December.

2019 
The Baku suburban railway or Absheron Circular line is a 91 km (57 mi) commuter rail service which began in 2019, serving the Azerbaijani capital Baku.

2021 
A new Laki station to Qabala single-line railway was opened in May. The railway is 42.3 kilometres along the axis, and 44.5 kilometres together with side railways.

2023 
Azerbaijan Republic for first time begins passenger transportation by high-speed train on Baku-Agstafa-Baku route in March.

Rolling Stock 
Azərbaycan Dəmir Yolları uses a variety of rolling stock for their services. Trains are operated with diesel and electric locomotives. Steam locomotives have been phased out.

Stadler Rail and local partner International Railway Distribution LLC announced the formation of a 51:49 joint venture on July 17, 2014. Since then there is no any progress for locally manufactured train supply.

See also
 Azerbaijan
 Rail transport in Azerbaijan
 Transport in Azerbaijan
 Chingiz Ildyrym

References

External links
 Azerbaijan Railways Official Site 
 Gallery and Information of the Electric Locomotives of the Azerbaijan Railways  
 
 

Rail transport in Azerbaijan
Railway companies of the Soviet Union
Public transport companies in Azerbaijan
Companies based in Baku
Railway companies established in 1991
Azerbaijani brands
1991 establishments in Azerbaijan